Kalāt or Qalāt (Brahui/Balochi: قلات), historically known as Qīqān, is a historic town located in Kalat District, Balochistan, Pakistan. Kalat is the capital of Kalat District and is known locally as Kalat-e-Brahui and Kalat-e-Sewa.

Qalat, formerly Qilat, is located roughly in the center of Balochistan, Pakistan, It was the capital of the Kalat Khanate. The current Khan of Kalat is a ceremonial title held by Mir Suleman Dawood Jan, and efforts have been made by the Pakistani government to reconcile with him; his son Prince Mohammed, who is next in line to be the Khan of Kalat, is pro-Pakistan.

Climate
Kalat features a cold desert climate (BWk) under the Köppen climate classification.

The all-time lowest recorded temperature in Kalat was −17 °C on 20 January 1978, while the highest temperature ever recorded was 38 °C on 19 June 1977.

Demographics
The population is mostly Muslim (97 percent), with a Hindu population of three percent. In addition, there are some Hindu Hindkowan merchants who have settled in Kalat.

Kalat Kali Temple
There is a Hindu temple devoted to Kali. On 21 December 2010, the 82 year old chief-priest was abducted in what was reported as part of increasingly routine targeting of minority Hindus in the province.

History

   
The town of Kalat is said to have been founded by and named Qalat-e Sewa (Sewa's Fort), after Sewa, a legendary hero of the Brahui people.

The Brahui Speaking tribes arrived from east in the Qalat area way before the arrival of Balochi speaking tribes from the west. The Brohis established a large kingdom in the 15th century, but it soon declined and the region fell to  Mughals for a short period. The brahui speaking Khans of Qalat were dominant from the 17th century onwards until the arrival of the British in the 19th century. A treaty was signed in 1876 to make Qalat part of the British Empire.

In 1947, the Khan of Kalat reportedly acceded to the dominion of Pakistan. 
In 1948, Qalat became part of Pakistan when the British withdrew. The last Khan of Qalat was formally removed from power in 1955, but the title is still claimed by his descendants. The current Khan of Qalat is Mir Suleman Dawood Khan Ahmadzai.

References

Kalat district - The Planning and Development Department of the Government of Balochistan

External links
 The Land and People of Baluchistan

Populated places in Kalat District

sv:Kalat